Augustana Academy was an educational institution in Canton, South Dakota.

The Norwegian Augustana Synod was established in 1870. In that year, the Synod began an academy called the Marshall Academy in Marshall, Wisconsin. In 1881, the academy was moved to Beloit, Iowa, and renamed to Augustana Seminary and Academy. In 1884 the institution, now simply called Augustana College, moved from Beloit to Canton, South Dakota.  It included Augustana Academy for high school students. 

In 1917 the Norwegian Synod, Hauge Synod and the United Norwegian Lutheran Church in America merged to become the Norwegian Lutheran Church of America. The new synod combined Augustana College with Lutheran Normal School in Sioux Falls, some 25 miles away. The Normal School was from the Norwegian Synod. Augustana Academy, no longer a division of the college, remained in Canton.  Augustana Academy closed in 1971. Since Augustana Academy closed, its records are held by Augustana University in Sioux Falls.

Notable alumni

 Carl Braaten, America theologian
 Ernest O. Lawrence, pioneer in nuclear medicine. He won the Nobel Prize in Physics for his work on the first nuclear cyclotron. Lawrence Livermore National Laboratory and Lawrence Berkeley National Laboratory are named in his honor.
 Ole Rølvaag, well known for his writings on the Norwegian American immigrant experience on the Great Plains. Among other writings, he was author of Giants in the Earth.
 Archie M. Gubbrud, 22nd Governor of South Dakota
 Mary Hart, longtime host of Entertainment Tonight

References

Other sources

Nelson, E. Clifford, and Fevold, Eugene L. The Lutheran Church among Norwegian-Americans: a history of the Evangelical Lutheran Church (Minneapolis: Augsburg Publishing House, 1960)

Defunct Lutheran schools
Defunct schools in South Dakota
Defunct Christian schools in the United States
Buildings and structures in Lincoln County, South Dakota
Norwegian-American culture in South Dakota